A hangar is a structure built to house aircraft. 

"Hangar" may also refer to:

Structures

In general
Airship hangar, a hangar for lighter-than-air aircraft
Bellman hangar, a type of temporary hangar designed in 1936
Bessonneau hangar, a type of temporary hangar designed in 1908
Blister hangar, a type of portable hangar designed in 1939
Tee hangar, a type of hangar used primarily for general aviation aircraft
Underground hangar, a type of hangar used for military aircraft

Specific structures

In use as aviation hangars
The Hangar Flight Museum, Calgary, Alberta, Canada; at the Calgary International Airport; a museum storing aircraft
Hangar One (Los Angeles, California), a hangar at Los Angeles International Airport
Hangar-7, a building in Salzburg, Austria that houses a collection of historical aircraft
Ispahani Hangar, a hangar used by Pakistan International Airlines at Jinnah International Airport in Karachi, Pakistan
Lower Souris National Wildlife Refuge Airplane Hangar, a hangar at the J. Clark Salyer National Wildlife Refuge in North Dakota
Riverside Hangar, hangars at St. Paul Downtown Airport in St. Paul, Minnesota

No longer aviation hangars
Hangar AE, a NASA facility at the Kennedy Space Center
Hangar H, a building on Magretheholm in Copenhagen, Denmark
Hangar No. 1, Lakehurst Naval Air Station, a former airship hangar best known as the site of the Hindenburg disaster
Hangar One (Mountain View, California), a former airship hangar and one of the world's largest freestanding structures
Hangar Theatre, a theatre in Ithaca, New York
Hangar 9, Brooks City-Base, a hangar in San Antonio, Texas, the oldest U.S. Air Force hangar
King Airfield Hangar, a historic hangar in Taunton, Massachusetts
Weeksville Dirigible Hangar, a former airship hangar in Elizabeth City, North Carolina

Other facilities and structures
The Hangar, Melbourne Airport, Melbourne, Victoria, Australia; a sports facility for the Essendon Football Club in the Australian Football League
Hangar (Lancaster, California), a minor-league baseball stadium
Hangares metro station, a metro station in Mexico City, Mexico
Station Les Hangars (Tram de Bordeaux), a metro station in Bordeaux, France

Places
Hangar, Iran
Hangar-e Pain, Iran
Le Hangar (Îlots des Apôtres), Crozet Islands, French Southern and Antarctic Lands, France; an islet

Media
INXS: Live at Barker Hangar, an album by INXS
Hangar 17, a children's show from the early 1990s
Hangar 18 (band), a hip hop group
Hangar 18 (film), a 1980 science fiction film
"Hangar 18" (song), a song by Megadeath
Who's Landing in My Hangar?, an album by Human Switchboard

Other
Hangar One Vodka, a vodka from Alameda, California
Hangar rash, a term for minor aircraft damage due to mishandling on the ground
Hangar 8, a private-jet management company
Hangar 9, a line of radio-controlled model aircraft
Ava Hangar, Italian drag queen

See also

Hangar One (disambiguation)
Hangar 18 (disambiguation)

Hanger (disambiguation)